This is a list of things named after English broadcaster, biologist, natural historian and author Sir David Attenborough, and his audiovisual works.

Buildings
 David Attenborough Building in Cambridge, which houses the Cambridge University Museum of Zoology and the Cambridge Conservation Initiative (CCI).

Ships
 RRS Sir David Attenborough, a British polar research ship; famously involved in the Boaty McBoatface naming poll controversy.

Taxonomy
David Attenborough's long trajectory working on nature documentaries and supporting conservation initiatives has made him an inspiration and a popular choice among naturalists to honour him with eponyms when naming newly described organisms. Attenborough himself has said that this is the "biggest of compliments that you could ask from any scientific community."

As of 2022, there are more than 50 taxa (genera and species) of organisms that have been named after David Attenborough. Additionally, there is at least one species named after one of his documentary series.

This list presents the scientific names as originally given (their basionyms). By default, they are shown in the chronological order in which they were published. They can also be ordered alphabetically by genus or by type of organism.

See also
 List of organisms named after famous people

References

David Attenborough
Attenborough, David
Taxonomic lists